Sizzlar is the debut studio album by Australian record producer, L D R U. The album was released on 14 July 2017 and peaked at number 66 on the Australian ARIA Albums Chart. A remix album was released in February 2018.

When speaking about the album, Carmody said "Take My" is his favourite track because "it's kind of a bit different and out of the norm to what I'd usually do... It was about a one night stand and picking up girls in the club, so it was kind of a fun process to write about."

Track listing

Charts

Release history

References

2017 debut albums
L D R U albums
Sony Music Australia albums